Leuvehaven is an underground subway station in the city of Rotterdam. It is part of Rotterdam Metro lines D and E. The station opened on 9 February 1968, the same date that the North-South Line (also formerly called Erasmus line), of which it is a part, was opened.

The station is located in the southern part of the center of Rotterdam, underneath the Schiedamsedijk, and near the northern end of the Erasmus Bridge.

Rotterdam Metro stations
RandstadRail stations in Rotterdam
Railway stations opened in 1968
1968 establishments in the Netherlands
Railway stations in the Netherlands opened in the 20th century
Railway stations in the Netherlands opened in the 1960s